The 2004 Golden Globes (Portugal) were held at the Coliseu dos Recreios, Lisbon on 25 May 2004.

Winners
Cinema:
Best Film: Quaresma, with José Álvaro Morais
Best Actress: Beatriz Batarda, in Quaresma
nominated: Paula Mora, in Os Imortais
Best Actor: Nicolau Breyner, in Os Imortais

Theatre:
Best Actress: Carmen Dolores
Best Actor: Luís Alberto
Best Play: Copenhaga (enc. João Lourenço)

Music:
Best Performer: Rui Veloso
Best Group: Mesa
Best Song: Carta- Toranja

Television:
Fiction and Comedy :
Best Program: Malucos do Riso
Best Actress: Alexandra Lencastre (Ana e os Sete)
Best Actor: Diogo Infante (Jóia de África)

Information:
Best Presenter: José Alberto Carvalho (Telejornal RTP)
Best Program: Telejornal (RTP)

Entertainment:
Best Program: Operação Triunfo
Best Presenter: Jorge Gabriel

Award of Merit and Excellence:
Eusébio

References

2003 film awards
2003 music awards
2003 television awards
Golden Globes (Portugal)
2004 in Portugal